The Finnish order of precedence is a nominal and symbolic hierarchy of important positions within the government of Finland.  It has no legal standing, it does not reflect the Finnish presidential line of succession or the co-equal status of the branches of government under the constitution, and is only used to indicate ceremonial protocol.

President of the Republic Sauli Niinistö
Retired Presidents of the Republic in order of term:
President Martti Ahtisaari
President Tarja Halonen
Speaker of the Parliament Matti Vanhanen
Prime Minister Sanna Marin
President of the Supreme Court Tatu Leppänen
President of the Supreme Administrative Court Kari Kuusiniemi
Chief of Defence Timo Kivinen
Chancellor of Justice Tuomas Pöysti
Archbishop of Turku Tapio Luoma
Chancellor of the Order of the Cross of Liberty Gustav Hägglund
Chancellor of the Order of the White Rose of Finland and the Order of the Lion of Finland Jussi Nuorteva
Chancellor of the University of Helsinki Kaarle Hämeri

External links
 

Orders of precedence
Society of Finland